Montséret is a commune in the Aude department in southern France. Montséret is a small wine-producing village in the wine district of Corbières. The village's annual festival is held in early- to mid-July and includes a community dinner.

Population

See also
 Corbières AOC
 Communes of the Aude department

References

Communes of Aude
Aude communes articles needing translation from French Wikipedia